Šerovo ( or ) is a settlement in the Municipality of Šmarje pri Jelšah in eastern Slovenia. The area was part of the historical region of Styria. With the division of Slovenia into Statistical regions in 2007, the municipality was included in the Savinja Statistical Region.

References

External links
Šerovo at Geopedia

Populated places in the Municipality of Šmarje pri Jelšah